Lloyd's unlimited rating is a rating applied to hydroplanes competing for the water speed record, as applied by Lloyd's Register. It is usually denoted by a circular white badge on the hull, with an infinity symbol "∞" above the K and number for Lloyd's "unlimited" group.

The group has included:

References 

Water speed records